Francesca Baudin (born 25 November 1993) is an Italian cross-country skier. She competed in the World Cup 2015 season.

She represented Italy at the FIS Nordic World Ski Championships 2015 in Falun.

Cross-country skiing results
All results are sourced from the International Ski Federation (FIS).

World Championships

World Cup

Season standings

References

External links 
 

1993 births
Living people
Italian female cross-country skiers
People from Aosta